

Tatnoth was a medieval Bishop of Rochester. He was elected in 844. He died between 845 and 868.

Citations

References

External links
 

Bishops of Rochester
9th-century English bishops